Carlo De Mejo (17 January 1945 – 18 December 2015) was an Italian actor.

Life and career 
Born in Rome, De Mejo was the eldest son of jazz composer Oscar De Mejo and actress Alida Valli. After a few minor roles, he had his breakout with the role of a male prostitute in Pier Paolo Pasolini's Teorema. In 1970 he played Claude in Giuseppe Patroni Griffi and Victor Spinetti's Italian adaptation of the stage musical Hair. In the following years, he became very active as a character actor in genre films, especially Lucio Fulci's cult horror films.

Selected filmography

 Hamisha Yamim B'Sinai (1968) - Ylan
 L'oro di Londra (1968) - Frankie
 Summit (1968)
 Teorema (1968) - Boy
 La colomba non deve volare (1970)
 Microscopic Liquid Subway to Oblivion (1970) - Billy
 Equinozio (1971)
 The Dead Are Alive (1972) - Igor Samarakis
 When Women Were Called Virgins (1972) - Gisippo
 The Outside Man (1972) - Karl
 Défense de savoir (1973)
 Stateline Motel (1973) - Albert
 The Net (1975) - Francesco Vanetti
 La sposina (1976) - Massimo Raimondi
 The Cassandra Crossing (1976) - Faux Patient (uncredited)
 Un cuore semplice (1977)
 Porco mondo (1978) - Massimo
 Cindy's Love Games (1979) - Valerio
 Eros Perversion (1979) - Orsino
 Terror Express (1980) - Ernie
 Contamination (1980) - Agent Young
 City of the Living Dead (1980) - Gerry
 La locanda della maladolescenza (1980) - Andrea Poggi
 The Other Hell (1981) - Father Valerio
 The House by the Cemetery (1981) - Mr. Wheatley
 Manhattan Baby (1982) - Luke
 Emanuelle Escapes from Hell (1983)
 Al limite, cioè, non glielo dico (1984)
 À notre regrettable époux (1988) - Mercanton
 I fobici (1999) - A Party Guest (segment "Frutto Proibito")
 H.P. Lovecraft: Two Left Arms (2013) - Antonio Mezzanotte (final film role)

References

External links 
  
 

1945 births
20th-century Italian male actors
Italian male stage actors
Italian male film actors
Italian male television actors 
Male actors from Rome
2015 deaths